Register Transfer Notation (or RTN) is a way of specifying the behavior of a digital synchronous circuit. An example of high-level RTN is Verilog, and a low-level example is Register Transfer Language.

RTN may be written as either abstract or concrete. Abstract RTN is a generic notation which does not have any specific machine implementation details. In contrast, concrete RTN is a notation which does implement specifics of the machine for which it is designed.  
The possible locations in which transfer of information occurs are:
 Memory-location
 Processor Register
 Registers in I/O device 

Hardware description languages